Roznowo may refer to the following places:
Rożnowo, Greater Poland Voivodeship (west-central Poland)
Rożnowo, West Pomeranian Voivodeship (north-west Poland)
Różnowo, Kuyavian-Pomeranian Voivodeship (north-central Poland)
Różnowo, Iława County in Warmian-Masurian Voivodeship (north Poland)
Różnowo, Olsztyn County in Warmian-Masurian Voivodeship (north Poland)
Różnowo, Ostróda County in Warmian-Masurian Voivodeship (north Poland)